Mt. Pleasant School, now known as Mt. Olive Methodist Church, is a historic one-room school building located near Gerrardstown, Berkeley County, West Virginia. It was built about 1897 and is a one-story, gable roofed vernacular building.  It measures approximately 24 feet wide and 39 feet deep.  The exterior is finished in native random ashlar limestone.  It is built into the slope of the hillside, and features a raised front porch.  The school was built for African American children.  It ceased use as a school in 1939 and began use as a church in 1942.

It was listed on the National Register of Historic Places in 2008.

References

Defunct schools in West Virginia
Educational institutions disestablished in 1939
Educational institutions established in 1897
Former school buildings in the United States
Historically segregated African-American schools in West Virginia
National Register of Historic Places in Berkeley County, West Virginia
One-room schoolhouses in West Virginia
School buildings completed in 1897
Schools in Berkeley County, West Virginia
School buildings on the National Register of Historic Places in West Virginia
1897 establishments in West Virginia